God Bless Miss Black America is a studio album released on  by alternative rock band Miss Black America on Integrity Records. It was Miss Black America's debut album.

Track listing

Production
All lyrics were written by Seymour Glass (with the exception of "Scream For Me", which also features vocals from Mike Smith) and all music was written by Miss Black America. It was produced by Gavin Monaghan. It was engineered by Andy Taylor. It was mastered by Ian Shepherd at SRT. Photography for the artwork was produced by Julia Kidd and Daisy Metz.

Personnel
Seymour Glass - vocals, additional guitars
Mickey Smith - bass, extra vocals on Scream For Me
Neil D. Baldwin - drums
Gish - guitar

Singles
Five tracks from the album were released as single, they were;
Don't Speak My Mind
Infinite Chinese Box
Talk Hard
Miss Black America
Human Punk (included on the "Adrenaline Junkie Class-A Mentalist" E.P.)

All five were included in two of John Peel's Festive Fiftys. "Don't Speak My Mind" and "Human Punk" were included in the 2001 list, placed at number 42 and number 14 respectively, while "Infinite Chinese Box", "Miss Black America" and "Talk Hard" were placed at 45, 11 and 3 respectively in the 2002 list.

Reception

The album has been described as a "fast 'n' hard sonic pummelling", and that "much of God Bless sounds like the more mature Manic Street Preachers playing U2's Boy".

References

Miss Black America (band) albums
2003 debut albums